Luciano Trani (born 10 August 1966 in Melbourne, Victoria) is an Australian former football (soccer) player who currently serves as an assistant head coach with A-League club Melbourne Victory FC.

Coaching career
Trani began coaching at the Victorian Premier League and National Soccer League levels with the Fawkner Blues, Essendon Royals, Whittlesea Stallions, Brisbane Strikers and the Melbourne Knights. He then took up roles as a coaching instructor for Football Federation Victoria and Head Coach of Pascoe Vale FC, before joining Wellington Phoenix. He then transferred to a job at Adelaide United where he joined as Assistant coach and was the Acting Coach 

On 23 August, 2012, Trani had left his post at Adelaide United after rejecting a reshuffle into a youth coaching role. Trani was officially announced as the new assistant coach of Brisbane Roar FC on 8 August 2013. After a title-winning season with Brisbane Roar, he moved to take up the same role at league rivals Melbourne City FC in May 2014.

In May 2016, Trani parted ways with Melbourne City FC.

One month later, he joined the Newcastle Jets as their assistant coach. However, he was sacked so as to resolve internal issues between himself and the head coach, Scott Miller.

Trani returned to management in October 2017, when he took up a role as senior head coach of National Premier Leagues Victoria 2 side North Geelong Warriors FC. Trani resigned from his position on 7 May 2018.

Trani joined Belgian First Division A club Sint-Truidense V.V. as an assistant coach in 2020.

On 1 July 2021, Trani joined Melbourne Victory FC as an assistant coach.

References

1966 births
Living people
Soccer players from Melbourne
Australian soccer coaches
Melbourne City FC non-playing staff
Association football midfielders
Association football players not categorized by nationality
Association football coaches
Australian expatriate sportspeople in Belgium
Australian expatriate sportspeople in New Zealand